The MIT School of Humanities, Arts, and Social Sciences (SHASS) is one of the five schools of the Massachusetts Institute of Technology, located in Cambridge, Massachusetts, US. The school has over 20 departments, department-level programs, and faculties granting SB, SM, and PhD degrees. Major fields of study include anthropology, comparative media studies, economics, history, linguistics, literature, music, philosophy, political science, and theater arts. Other programs include the Center for International Studies; Knight Science Journalism; Science, Technology, and Society; Security Studies; and HyperStudio (digital humanities).

In 2018, the Times Higher Education World University Rankings rated MIT the #2 university for arts and humanities.

, the Dean of the School is Professor Agustin Rayo. With over 200 faculty members, 330 graduate students, and 109 undergraduate majors and 161 minors, the school is the fourth largest at MIT. All MIT undergraduates must take at least 8 semesters of courses (approximately 25% of total classroom time) in SHASS as part of the General Institute Requirements for a diploma, and those minoring or majoring within the School undertake additional studies and projects.

, 4 Nobel Laureates, 7 MacArthur Fellows, and 4 Pulitzer Prize winners were members of the SHASS faculty. Additionally, 2 National Medal of Science awardees,
11 National Academy of Sciences Fellows, 57 American Academy of Arts and Sciences Fellows, 40 Guggenheim Fellowships, and 5 John Bates Clark Medalists are associated with SHASS.
 
In March 2017, MIT announced the new Theater Arts Building (Building W97) located at 345 Vassar Street at the far western end of campus. Constructed in a completely renovated former warehouse, the facility consolidates the performance and design spaces of a new academic major in Theater Arts, which was established in 2015. The building's  includes a two-story, 180-seat, multimedia-equipped performance space which can be reconfigured for each use; as well as a rehearsal studio, dressing rooms, and set and costume makerspaces.

References

Massachusetts Institute of Technology
University subdivisions in Massachusetts